Antonio Infantino (born 23 March 1991) is an Italian sprinter who has won two national titles at the senior level. He competed at the 2020 Summer Olympics, in 200 m.

Career
Born in England to Italian parents, Infantino trains at the Lee Valley Athletics Center in London, where he grew up sporting. He participated in one edition of the European Athletics Championships in 2016, one of the World Athletics Championships in Doha 2019 and one World Athletics Relays Championships in 2021.  In 2021 he made his first Olympic Games, qualifying for both the 200m and 4x100m relay.

In April 2022 he was suspended for thee years for a doping violation.

National titles
 Italian Athletics Championships
 200 metres: 2019, 2020

See also
 Italian all-time lists - 200 metres
 List of eligibility transfers in athletics
 Naturalized athletes of Italy

References

External links
 

1991 births
Living people
Italian male sprinters
Sportspeople from Welwyn Garden City
Italian Athletics Championships winners
Athletes (track and field) at the 2020 Summer Olympics
Olympic athletes of Italy
Doping cases in athletics
21st-century Italian people